Tchaikovsky is a 1970 Soviet biopic film directed by Igor Talankin. It featured Innokenty Smoktunovsky in the role of the famous Russian composer Pyotr Ilyich Tchaikovsky. It was nominated for the Academy Award for Best Foreign Language Film as well as the Academy Award for Original Song Score and Adaptation.

Cast
 Innokenty Smoktunovsky as Pyotr Ilyich Tchaikovsky
 Antonina Shuranova as Nadezhda von Meck
 Kirill Lavrov as Władysław Pachulski
 Vladislav Strzhelchik as Nikolai Rubinstein
 Yevgeny Leonov as Alyosha
 Maya Plisetskaya as Désirée Artôt
 Bruno Freindlich as Ivan Turgenev
 Alla Demidova as Yulia von Meck
Yevgeny Yevstigneyev as Herman Laroche
Nina Agapova as a guest
Maria Vinogradova as a lady calling for the police
Nikolay Trofimov as chief of police
 Laurence Harvey as Narrator (English version)

See also
 List of submissions to the 44th Academy Awards for Best Foreign Language Film
List of Soviet submissions for the Academy Award for Best International Feature Film

References

External links

1970 films
1970s biographical drama films
Soviet biographical drama films
Russian biographical drama films
1970s Russian-language films
Films about classical music and musicians
Biographical films about composers
Films directed by Igor Talankin
Films scored by Dimitri Tiomkin
Films set in the 19th century
Cultural depictions of Pyotr Ilyich Tchaikovsky
Mosfilm films
1970 drama films